Bonney may refer to:

 Bonney, Texas
 Bonney Lake, Washington
 Bonney (surname)

See also
 Bonny (disambiguation)